The NT Indigenous Music Awards 2004 is the inaugural annual National Indigenous Music Awards, established by MusicNT. The new awards recognise excellence, dedication, innovation and outstanding contributions in the Northern Territory music industry.

Members of the public could nominate a musician or band for the People's Choice Award. The awards ceremony was held on 28 August 2004.

Performers
The Mills Sisters
Shellie Morris
Yothu Yindi
Nabarlek

Hall of Fame Inductee 
 Mandawuy Yunupingu & George Rrurrambu

Mandawuy Yunupingu was inducted into the NT Music Hall of Fame for his 20-year contribution to Indigenous music.

Awards
Male Artist of the Year

Female Artist of the Year

Band of the Year

Best New Talent of the Year

People's Choice Award

Traditional Music Award

Excellence in Music Industry Training

References

2004 in Australian music
2004 music awards
National Indigenous Music Awards